The 1955 McNeese State Cowboys football team was an American football team that represented the McNeese State College—now known as McNeese State University–as a member of the Gulf States Conference (GSC) during the 1955 college football season. Led by first-year head coach John Gregory, the Cowboys compiled and overall record of 7–1–1 with a mark of 5–1 in conference play, placing second in the GSC.

Schedule

References

McNeese State
McNeese Cowboys football seasons
McNeese State Cowboys football